The Western Australian Internet Exchange (WAIX) was formed in 1997 as a neutral Internet Exchange Point in Perth, Australia. Its three founding members were iiNet, Omen Internet and Wantree Internet. Today WAIX has some 100 peers and facilitates the transfer of over 50 gigabits per second.

The exchange is operated by the Internet Association of Australia (IAA) which is a not-for-profit, member driven, licensed telecommunications carrier. WAIX is the longest running exchange point in Australia and celebrates its 25 year anniversary in 2022. The Association operates Internet Exchange Points across Australia.

Originally located only in the QV.1 building in central Perth, and now in numerous locations across Perth, most Western Australian ISPs also peer at the facility.

Brief history

The peering fabric first existed informally as links between "Wantree Internet" and "Omen Internet" to iiNet. WAIX was formalised as an initiative by the then Western Australian Internet Association (which became the Internet Association of Australia) after a presentation by Andrew Khoo on his similar work in Sydney and Melbourne to create multi-lateral peering fabrics in both cities. The ISPs at the presentation later agreed they could form the fabric themselves and did so by leasing a small room in QV.1 and began as a formal peering exchange after Omen, iiNet and Wantree moved their interconnects into the peering room.

Various attempts were made over the first few years to arrange traffic exchange between peers at WAIX and peers at other Australian internet exchanges (notably the "South Australia Internet Exchange", or SAIX) allowing peers to pay for interstate traffic. This was an arrangement with one of the peers at the time (information needed) who peered at more than one Australian peering fabric. Similar arrangements were formalised in the eastern states with the formation of AusBone.

See also 
 List of Internet exchange points

External links

 Internet Association of Australia peering homepage
 Usenet article announcing the Peering Discussion
 APNIC Blog What is the role of IXPs in Oceania?

References

Internet exchange points in Australia
Science and technology in Western Australia
Internet mirror services